Meeker was a hamlet in Washington County, Wisconsin, United States. The area is now part of the Village of Germantown, at latitude 43.2217 and longitude -88.1731, centered on what is now the intersection of Mequon Road and Meeker Hill Lane.

Notable people 
Baltus Mantz, Wisconsin State Senator, lived in Meeker.

References 

Populated places in Washington County, Wisconsin
Neighborhoods in Wisconsin